Chortonoeca is a monotypic snout moth genus in the family Pyralidae. Its single species, Chortonoeca leucocraspia, is known from Algeria. Both the genus and species were described by George Hampson in 1918.

References

Anerastiini
Monotypic moth genera
Endemic fauna of Algeria
Moths of Africa
Pyralidae genera